The Philippine Saringhimig Singers (magical wings of song) are a Filipino American choir based in San Francisco, California. In the mid 1980s the choir was also known as the Camerata singers as they toured as a chamber choir throughout Europe

The choir's maestro, George Gemora Hernandez, formed Saringhimig Singers in 1974 at the University of the Philippines together with the other students from the College of Music.

This is a list of the choir's activity and achievements:

2014 – present Reorganized, Series of Concerts
 Concerts in Walnut Creek, San Francisco, Antioch, Fremont, Manteca and Daly City

2008 -2010 Annual Christmas Concerts & Short Performances
Vallejo, Sunny Vale, Santa Clara and San Francisco

2007 Concert Series
 First California International Choral Festival and Competition, San Luis Obispo Third Place - Choir’s Choice Category
 Concerts in Glendale, Daly City, San Mateo, Stockton

2006 Canadian Concert Tour
 XII International Choral Kathaumixw, Powell River, British Columbia, Canada First Place - Contemporary Choral Music Category Second Place - Adult Mixed Voice Choir Category
 Kathaumixw Concerts Around BC, Maple Ridge
 Concerts in San Mateo, San Francisco
 Annual Christmas Concert

2005 European Concert Tour
 LI Concorso de Habaneras y Polifonico, Torrevieja, Spain Third Place - Polyphony Category
 California State Capitol Senate Floor, Sacramento Award of Recognition for “Excellence in Choral Performances in California and Around the World”             presented by Senator Torlakson
 Participant, Founders 7th Annual International Choir Festival, Los Angeles
 2005 World Musikahan with Ryan Cayabyab, Special Guest
 San Francisco City Hall Celebration of Philippine Month, Special Guest
 Concerts in San Francisco, Oakland, Fremont, and Manteca
 Annual Christmas Concert
 
2004 European Concert Tour
 58th Llangollen International Musical Eisteddfod, Wales Fifth Place - Both in Chamber Category and Folkloric Category
 XXII Festival Internacional de Musica de Cantonigros, Spain
 Participant, Founders 6th Annual International Choir Festival, Los Angeles
 Concerts in San Francisco, Milpitas, Oakland, Manteca and Los Angeles
 Annual Christmas Concert
      
2003 Mexico Concert Tour
 IV Festival Mundial de Coros, Puebla, Mexico Voted “Best Choir”
 Concerts in San Francisco, San Jose, Manteca and Milpitas
 Annual Christmas Concert
 
1996 Germany Concert Tour
 Concerts in different cities in Germany
 
1994 Spain Concert Tour
 Participant Cant’ Coral de Puig-reig, Spain
 Concerts Different cities in the Catalunya region of Spain
 
1983 European & Northern American Tour
 Top Prize XXXI Concorso Polifonico Internationale Guido D’Arezzo, Italy Folkloric Category
 Top Prize XXII International Choral Competition, Gorizia – Italy Folkloric Category
 Participant, Cant’ Coral de Puig-reig, Spain
 Concerts Germany, Italy, Spain, Czechoslovakia, United Kingdom, France, Canada, USA
 
1981 European Tour
 Third Prize Llangollen International Musical Eisteddfod, Wales (Mixed Choir Category)
 Top Prize XXVIII Concorso Polifonico Internationale Guido D’Arezzo, Italy
 Male Choir Category (Ave Maria Male Choir)
 Participant Cant’ Coral de Puig-reig, Spain
 Participant Jornades Musicales Internacionales, Barcelona, Spain
 Participant East Mersea Music Camp, Essex, United Kingdom
 Concerts United Kingdom, Spain, Italy, Germany
 
1980 European Concert Tour
 Grand Prize Lehiateka Certamen Cancion y Polifonica Vascas, Tolosa, Spain
 Third Prize Llangollen International Musical Eisteddfod, Wales - Folkloric Category (First Philippine Choir to participate in the Eisteddfod)
 Participant Sonnenberg Youth Music Camp, Germany
 Participant Cant’ Coral de Puig-reig, Spain
 Participant Cant’ Coral Barcelona, Spain
 Recording Radio Rundfunk Stuttgart, Germany
 Concerts Spain, United Kingdom, Germany, Austria, Denmark
 
1979 European Concert Tour
 First Prize XXVII Concorso Polifonico Internationale Guido D’Arezzo, Italy
 Participant Cant’ Coral de Puig-reig, Spain
 Participant XV Dia del Cant’ Coral Barcelona, Spain
 Performance at The World Premiere of Dieter Salbert’s Theaterliche Messe in Ansberg, Germany
 Performance at The 800th year Celebration of the Rhine Cathedral of Cologne, Germany
 Concerts United Kingdom, Germany, Spain, Yugoslavia, Poland, Italy

In 1980 Hernandez also conducted the Ave Maria Male Choral and received the First prize for the male choir category at the XXVIII Concorso Polifonico Internationale, Guido d’ Arezzo, Italy. He restarted the Saringhimig choir in 2002; in 2003 they were voted “Best Choir” in the World Choral Festival in Puebla, Mexico. They also won 4th place at the LLangollen International Musical Eisteddfod in 2004,
Third prize at Certamen de Habaneras y Polifonia in Torrevieja, Spain in 2005 and
First prize and Second Prize at Kathaumiwx International Choral Competition in Powell River, BC, Canada in 2006. Between 2009-2014 the choir was on a hiatus but since late 2014 the choir is once again active. Their most recent engagement was a music festival during July 2016 in Loreto, Italy

References

External links
 Official site

Choirs in the San Francisco Bay Area
Filipino choirs
Musical groups established in 1974
1974 establishments in the Philippines